Henry Colt may refer to:

Harry Colt, Henry Colt, golf course architect
Sir Henry Colt, 1st Baronet, MP for Newport (Isle of Wight) and Westminster
Sir Henry Archer Colt, 9th Baronet (1882–1951), of the Colt baronets

See also
Colt (surname)